Country Wedding is an Icelandic film directed by Valdís Óskarsdóttir and released on 28 August 2008. It tells the story of a couple who decide to get married in a countryside church, but things do not go as planned.

Cast and characters
 Ingvar Eggert Sigurðsson as Séra Brynjólfur
 Ólafur Darri Ólafsson as Egill
 Björn Hlynur Haraldsson as Barði
 Ágústa Eva Erlendsdóttir as Auður
 Gísli Örn Garðarsson as Grjóni
 Sigurður Sigurjónsson as Tómas
 Þröstur Leó Gunnarsson as Svanur
 Nína Dögg Filippusdóttir as Lára
 Hanna María Karlsdóttir as Imba
 Árni Pétur Guðjónsson as Stefán
 Kristbjörg Kjeld as Brynhildur
 Theódór Júlíusson as Lúðvík
 Nanna Kristín Magnúsdóttir as Inga
 Víkingur Kristjánsson as Hafsteinn

References

External links
 
 Country Wedding at Icelandicfilms

2008 films
Icelandic comedy films